Michaël Alexandre Bodegas (born 3 May 1987) is a water polo player from Italy. He was part of the Italian team at the 2016 Summer Olympics, where the team won the bronze medal.

See also
 List of Olympic medalists in water polo (men)
 List of world champions in men's water polo
 List of World Aquatics Championships medalists in water polo

References

External links
 

1987 births
Living people
People from La Seyne-sur-Mer
French emigrants to Italy
Naturalised citizens of Italy
Italian male water polo players
Water polo centre forwards
Water polo players at the 2016 Summer Olympics
Medalists at the 2016 Summer Olympics
Olympic bronze medalists for Italy in water polo
Water polo players at the 2020 Summer Olympics
Sportspeople from Var (department)
21st-century Italian people